Jennifer Bongardt (born 8 September 1982 in Hagen-Dahl) is a German slalom canoeist who competed at the international level from 1998 to 2010.

She won seven medals at the ICF Canoe Slalom World Championships with two golds (K1 and K1 team: both 2007), three silvers (K1: 2003, K1 team: 2003, 2010), and two bronzes (K1 and K1 team: both 2006). She also won four medals at the European Championships (2 golds, 1 silver and 1 bronze).

Bongardt competed in two Summer Olympics, earning her best finish of ninth in the K1 event in Athens in 2004.

World Cup individual podiums

1 European Championship counting for World Cup points
2 World Championship counting for World Cup points
3 Pan American Championship counting for World Cup points

References

Yahoo! Athens 2004 Sports profile

External links
Official website 

1982 births
Canoeists at the 2004 Summer Olympics
Canoeists at the 2008 Summer Olympics
German female canoeists
Living people
Olympic canoeists of Germany
Medalists at the ICF Canoe Slalom World Championships